Vinay Dinu Tendulkar is an Indian politician, serving as the Member of Parliament, Rajya Sabha from Goa since 2017. He is a senior leader of Bharatiya Janata Party and has been the President of the party (BJP) from Goa from 2012 to 2020, for two consecutive terms. Currently, he is a member of the Rubber Board committee and the Consultative Committee for the Ministry of Agriculture and Farmers Welfare. He was elected to the Rajya Sabha on 31 July 2017 from Goa. He is a member of the Transport, Tourism and Culture committee, prior to which he made substantial contribution towards forest development and protection in 2002 when he was the Forest Minister of Goa, as a part of Manohar Parrikar's Cabinet, the then Chief Minister of Goa. He was also a member of the Goa Legislative Assembly from March 1999 to June 2007. He was the vice chairman of the Goa State Infrastructure Development Corporation from 2000 to 2004.

Early life and education 
Born on 25 September 1961 in Khandepar, Distt. South Goa (Goa), to parents Shri Dinu A. Tendulkar and Shrimati Nilabai D. Tendulkar. Tendulkar, from his early life was a part of RSS and joined BJP in 1980. He was constantly involved in serving the weaker section of society to improve the quality of their life. Tendulkar has a Diploma in mechanical engineering from Mysore University, Karnataka. He quit his job in a mining company in 1994 to pursue politics full-time and was the president of Goa Youth BJP from 1994 to 1999. He later went on winning the Sanvordem seat twice- in 1999 and 2002.

Political career 
Currently, serving as the Member of Parliament, Rajya Sabha from Goa, Tendulkar has made commendable contributions to the Goa government in over two decades. Tendulkar's tenure as Goa party unit chief saw the BJP winning both the Lok Sabha seats in the state in 2014, a rare achievement for the party, and returning to power early in 2017 despite not being the single largest party in the Assembly.

In July 2017, he took an oath as a Rajya Sabha MP from Goa. Tendulkar's parliamentary statistics are a testimony to his exceptional work in the parliament. He has raised 68 starred and unstarred questions in the parliament, furthermore, he has participated in 87 debates in his tenure.

In his term as an MP, Tendulkar has provided various works to be carried out in his constituency from his MPLADs fund. He provided financial assurance to the Muslim community for the repair of Margao kabrastan, to reconstruct the damaged protection wall, and also to repair the shed.

Contribution in Covid 19 
Tendulkar sanctioned Rs. One Crore from the MPLADS Fund for the relief during the COVID-19 pandemic. He also gave his one month's salary to the Chief Minister's Relief Fund - Goa to support the state in the health emergency caused by COVID-19. Tendulkar also administered assistance to four rural hospitals in Goa and provided medical oxygen free of cost to patients in need. He provided dry ration to the migrant workers and the poor. He equally made efforts to generously help states like Madhya Pradesh, Karnataka, and Maharashtra in the procurement of ration for the migrant workers and travel assistance to ensure the safe return of the migrant workers.

Positions held 
1994 to 1999 President, Goa Youth BJP
1999 to 2007 Member, Goa Legislative Assembly 
1999 to 2005 Chairman, Planning and Development Authority of Goa 
2000 to 2004 Vice Chairman, Goa State Infrastructure Development Cooperation 
2005 to 2012 Vice President, Goa State BJP 
2012 to January 2020 President, Goa State BJP 
Chairman of Sahyadridudhsagar Education Society since 2015
Elected to Rajya Sabha in July 2017
September 2017 to May 2019 Member, Committee on Transport, Tourism and Culture 
September 2019 onwards, Member, Committee on Transport, Tourism and Culture 
2018 - 2020 Member, Rehabilitation Council of India

Member of Consultative Committee for the Ministry of Agriculture and Farmers Welfare Member of Rubber board

Career in social work 
Tendulkar has been associated with movements related to mining from the very beginning of his political career and has efficiently managed to highlight their issues at various platforms. He has also worked towards providing employment opportunities to the poor. He formed a corporate society consisting of  villagers from local mining jobs and provided job opportunities to them in the transport sector.

He has always been a hard-working party worker and worked towards the welfare of people. When he was the Forest minister in 2002, Tendulkar provided job opportunities and even arranged vehicles for villagers from rural areas to Dudhsagar and provided employment to them.

He always aimed at primary education for children from economically weaker sections. He was the Chairman of the Educational Society at Atal Bihari Vajpayee Higher Secondary School in 2002 and Sahyadridudhsagar Education Society since 2015.

Cultural activities 
Tendulkar is also fond of acting and has appeared in over 150 Marathi and Konkani plays. He was the president of Goa Chess Association from 2012 to 2017. In 2018, Sanjeev Verekar wrote a remarkable book Dabhal to Dili, on Tendulkar's life.

Personal life 
Tendulkar is married to Vibha V. Tendulkar and resides in Khadpabandh, Goa. They have a son.

References 

People from South Goa district
Bharatiya Janata Party politicians from Goa
Living people
21st-century Indian politicians
Rajya Sabha members from Goa
1961 births
State cabinet ministers of Goa
State Presidents of Bharatiya Janata Party
Goa MLAs 1999–2002
Goa MLAs 2002–2007